Khum Bahadur Khadka (1951-2018) was a Nepali politician who was an elected member in Nepali Congress Central Working Committee. He was a Minister of the Interior of Nepal and one of the most influential leaders of Nepali Congress Party. After some corruption allegations, he was not in active politics since about 2006-2007 and even withdrew his candidacy for the Constituent Assembly election from the Dang-1 constituency, after Maoists had accused him of responsibility in the killing of seven of their cadres. He was convicted on 13 August 2012 with several counts of corruption, slapping him one-and-half year jail sentence along with a penalty of 9.47 million Nepali rupees. His corruption escapades were mostly during the period when he held a number of high-ranking posts, including home minister and local development minister in the 1990s.

References

1951 births
Government ministers of Nepal
Nepali Congress politicians from Lumbini Province
2018 deaths
Nepal MPs 1991–1994
Nepal MPs 1999–2002
People of the Nepalese Civil War